Michał Sołowow (born 11 July 1962 in Kielce) is a Polish billionaire businessman and rally driver. His industrial group has 18 production plants in 8 countries and sells products in more than 60 countries on six continents and has over 16,000 employees.

His wealth is estimated at approx. 15,509 bn złoty (in 2021) making him the wealthiest person in Poland for fourth consecutive year (15,6 bn złoty in 2020, 13,3 bn złoty in 2019, and 11,41 bn złoty  in 2018). He was one of the biggest Polish stock exchange investors (by 2017 he delisted all his major companies from Warsaw Stock Exchange) but remains one of country's top private entrepreneurs and the largest Polish private investor abroad. He is the sole shareholder of the following companies: Synthos (chemical industry), Cersanit (sanitary ceramics and tiles) and Barlinek (producer of floorboards). The three companies remain at the core of Sołowow's capital group and are his main assets.

In 2022, Forbes estimated his net worth at US$6.2 billion making him 411th wealthiest person in the world.

Business empire 
Sołowow studied at Kielce University of Technology. In 1980s he earned money working in the West, so he was able to create Mitex construction enterprise in late 1980s in Kielce, when freedom of business was announced in still communist Polish People's Republic. After political and economical transformation in early 1990s, Mitex became one of bigger companies on regional construction market. Sołowow then became an active Warsaw Stock Exchange investor.

Sołowow bought shares in the chemical company Dwory (now Synthos) and funded its expansion with debt, taking advantage of low interest rates at the time. He then diversified into ceramic tiles, wood floors, real estate, new technologies and biotechnology sector. He gave up any direct management roles but is still an active investor (mostly on the private equity market).

In October 2019, Synthos Green Energy S.A., a Synthos Group company, entered into an agreement with US-Japanese GE Hitachi Nuclear Energy for cooperation in the potential construction of a nuclear power plant in Poland based on small modular reactors (SMR) BWRX-300 technology. This is the first agreement of this type concluded by a Polish private company.

Sołowow manages his assets through several funds including: Black Forest SICAV-SIF fund, FTF Columbus Fund, FTF Galleon, Magellan Pro-Equity Fund I S.A.

Sołowow also makes investments via IPOPEMA 112 FIZAN fund (e.g. Genicore, OncoArendi Therapeutics).

He is sole or key shareholder of the following companies:

 Synthos S.A. (chemical industry). One of the largest Polish chemical companies. It manufactures synthetic rubber and latex, styrene materials and vinyl dispersions;
 Cersanit S.A. – (sanitary ceramics and tiles). As of 2019 Cersanit is the largest ceramic tiles producer in Poland and second largest in Europe with 35% market share in Poland, 8% in Germany, 50% in Romania, and 40% in Ukraine. The company is the third largest ceramic products manufacturer in Europe and seventh in the world.  In 2007 Sołowow merged Cersanit with Opoczno at the time the largest ceramic tiles manufacturer in Poland and second largest in Europe.
 Barlinek S.A. (producer of floorboards). One of the largest manufacturers of natural wooden flooring systems in the world, and the most recognizable brand of natural floors in Poland. Barlinek floorboards are exported to 75 countries on 6 continents. In 2012 the company had 60% of the Polish floorboard market;
Komfort (carpets and linings retail chain);
Homla (interior decoration retail chain);
Nexterio (home decor);
Corab (largest manufacturer and distributor of elements for photovoltaics installations in Poland);
WP Systems (maintenance services for offshore wind farms); 
Syntos Green Energy (part of Synthos Group, responsible for new energy projects - offshore wind, nuclear, hydrogen);
New Era Materials (composite materials from epoxy resins);
3DGence (manufacturer of 3D printers);
Genicore (manufacturer of ovens for composite materials production);
OncoArendi (R&D of particles for the production of drugs for the treatment of inflammatory diseases and cancer; WSE-listed);
ExploRNA Therapeutics (R&D of mRNA modification technologies);
LifeFLow (R&D of non-invasive coronography technologies);
Tikrow (online temporary work platform);
GETCAR (car leasing);
 North Food – operator of restaurant chains in Poland and United Kingdom (North Food: fish and seafood; John Burg: New Zealand beef burgers; Veggie Hub);
Yamly - a start-up company, producer and distributor of plant-based foods.

Sołowow's closed investments include:

 Max (food retail chain) - founded in 1992 and sold to Dutch group Ahold in 1996;
 NOMI (first DIY retail chain in Poland) - founded in 1994 and sold in 1999 to Kingfisher plc;
 Exbud (construction)- minority stake sold to Swedish Skanska in 2000;
 Viscoplast (manufacturer of medical dressings) - minority stake sold to 3M in 2001;
 Mitex (construction and real estate development) - Sołowow founded the company in 1980s and sold to French group Eiffage in 2002;
 Echo Dnia/Słowo Ludu (local daily newspapers) - both purchased in the 1990s and sold in 2005 to Norwegian Orkla;
 UltraPack S.A. (production of corrugated board packagings) – Sołowow bought the company in 2003 and sold in 2007 to British multinational packaging group Mondi;
 Echo Investment (real estate development) - Sołowow founded the company in 1994 and sold his shares in 2015 to Oaktree and PIMCO;

Rally career 

Sołowow was interested in amateur rally driving as a teenager. In 2001, thanks to sponsorship of his companies Synthos and Cersanit, he started professional rally career, aside from his business activities. After several years of training and starts, he began to obtain good results. He was the European vice-champion (2008, 2009, 2012), the vice-champion of Poland (2006, 2010), the European second vice-champion (2006, 2010), and second vice-champion of Poland (2004, 2005). He suspended his career in 2015 and resumed it in 2020.

WRC results

PWRC results

Personal life 

Sołowow owns a residence in Masłów, a village on the borders of his hometown Kielce in Świętokrzyskie voivodship. His daughter, Karolina Sołowow (b. 1986), runs a charitable foundation "Fabryki Marzeń" ("Factories of Dreams") supporting disadvantaged youth.

References

External links
Results at ewrc-results.com

1962 births
Living people
Polish billionaires
Polish rally drivers
Intercontinental Rally Challenge drivers
World Rally Championship drivers
European Rally Championship drivers
Sportspeople from Kielce
M-Sport drivers